Jharsuguda is a district in Odisha, India with Jharsuguda town as its headquarters. This region is rich in coal and other mineral reserves. Of late, many small and medium scale iron and steel units have been set up in the vicinity of Jharsuguda town, giving impetus to the industrial growth of the district.

Major Tribes
This district has the major tribal populations among them important tribes are Sabara, Kisan, Kurukh, Bhuiyan, Munda, Santal. This district has unique diversity in terms of tribal culture, language and other focal culture. Kurukh people speak their mother tongue Kurukh language with Sadri language. Munda people speak their Ho language and Kisan people speak their Kisan dialect and Kharia speak their Kharia. Sadri and local Odia dialect is also quite popular among tribal communities.

Geography 
Jharsuguda district has three urban agglomerations, municipalities of Jharsuguda town and Brajrajnagar and municipality of Belpahar. Jharsuguda has its own airport named Veer Surendra Sai Airport. The district is bordered by Raigarh district of Chhattisgarh to the west, Sundergarh district to the north, Sambalpur district to the east and southeast and Bargarh district to the southwest. The district is mainly open plain, with some hills in the north.

Economy 
There are lot of coal mines situated in this area.

Brajrajnagar is an industrial town, being of the prime location for Open Cast Coal Mine of Ib Valley Coalfield of Mahanadi Coalfields Limited. Brajrajnagar also boasts of a large scale paper mill, i.e., Orient Paper Mills of the Birla Group of Industries. However, this mill has been defunct for more than a decade now. Brajrajnagar is also a tourist hub as there are a lot of big temples like Brajeswari temple near railway station, Ramchandi Mandir, Laxmi Narayan Mandir, Jagannath Temple, Shiv Mandir in Lamtibahal, Shani Mandir in college road, Mukteswar Temple in hill top colony, Shiv Mandir in Rampur as well as Shiv Temple of G.M. Office, Aditya Mandir in jharsuguda road, Mangala and Tarini Mandir in college road.

In 2006 the Ministry of Panchayati Raj named Jharsuguda one of the country's 250 most backward districts (out of a total of 640). It is one of the 19 districts in Odisha currently receiving funds from the Backward Regions Grant Fund Programme (BRGF).

The district once had an airport during World War II. In 2018 this airport was modernised into Jharsuguda Airport.

Divisions 
The district comprises five blocks, primary being Lakhanpur, Kolabira, Laikera, Kirmira and Jharsuguda.

Belpahar sub-division includes 12 villages and two town. The most populous villages are Lakhanpur & Chhualiberna. The main festival of Chhualiberna is Narsingh Puja which held on month of December. Brajrajnagar is also famous for rampur's ramchandi mandir on bank of the Ib river. Rampur colliery is famous for the oldest coal mines in India.

Demographics 

According to the 2011 census Jharsuguda district had a population of 579,505, roughly equal to the nation of Solomon Islands or the US state of Wyoming. This gives it a ranking of 530th in India (out of a total of 640).
Its population growth rate over the decade 2001–2011 was 13.69%. Jharsuguda had a sex ratio of 951 females for every 1,000 males, and a literacy rate of 78.36%. Scheduled Castes and Scheduled Tribes made up 18.05% and 30.50% of the population respectively.

At the time of the 2011 Census of India, 42.26% of the population spoke Sambalpuri, 27.42% Odia, 9.59% Hindi, 6.42% Kisan, 2.21% Mundari, 1.86% Kharia, 1.43% Chhattisgarhi, 1.27% Bengali and 1.11% Sadri as their mother tongue.

Politics

Vidhan sabha constituencies 

The following is the 2 Vidhan sabha constituencies of Jharsuguda district and the elected members of that area.

See also
Adhapara
Jharsuguda

References

External links 

 

 
Coal mining districts in India
Districts of Odisha